What Will You Do When You Catch Me? is the English title of Co mi zrobisz, jak mnie złapiesz? a Polish comedy film released in 1978, directed by Stanisław Bareja.

What Will You Do shares many themes in common with Bareja's other comedies, especially Teddy Bear, with an emphasis on the sheer absurdity of life under Communism. The plot is very convoluted similarly to other Bareja's screwball comedies and includes many interconnected storylines as well as scenes from day to day lives of hapless citizens of Warsaw.

Plot 

The main plot line revolves around Tadeusz Krzakoski (Krzysztof Kowalewski) director of a failing state-owned company. When his mistress, a daughter of a Communist party bigwig, announces that she's pregnant Tadeusz knows that in order to save his reputation and his job he needs to marry her. But as he is already married he tries to engineer a plot to get divorced quickly.

Cast
 Krzysztof Kowalewski - Tadeusz Krzakoski
 Bronisław Pawlik - Roman Ferde
 Stanisław Tym - Tadek Dudala / Szymek
 Ewa Wiśniewska - Anna Krzakoska
 Ewa Ziętek - Danusia
 Andrzej Fedorowicz - Mrugala
 Stefan Friedmann - Worker
 Janusz Gajos – Supermarket Manager
 Zdzisław Maklakiewicz – Father
 Zofia Merle - Krzakoski's Servant
 Stanisław Gawlik - Stefan Kołodziej

See also 
Cinema of Poland
List of Polish language films

External links

1978 films
1970s Polish-language films
Films set in Warsaw
Films shot in Warsaw
Polish comedy films
Films directed by Stanisław Bareja
1978 comedy films